The 1991 Libertarian National Convention was held in Chicago, Illinois from August 29 to August 31, 1991. Andre Marrou of Alaska was chosen as the  Libertarian Party's nominee for president in the 1992 election.

This was the first Libertarian National Convention to receive national television coverage, with C-SPAN broadcasting the convention.

Libertarians hold a National Convention every two years to vote on party bylaws, platform and resolutions and elect national party officers and a judicial committee. Every four years it nominates presidential and vice presidential candidates.

Voting for presidential nomination

Candidates
 Richard Boddie, college teacher and motivational speaker from California
 Andre Marrou, real estate broker from Nevada
 David Raaflaub
 Hans Schroeder

First ballot
Andre Marrou was elected on the first ballot, gathering a majority of the voting delegates, securing nomination.

Voting for vice presidential nomination
A separate vote was held for the vice presidential nomination.  Nancy Lord was nominated on the third ballot.

First ballot

Second ballot
After the second ballot, Ruwart dropped out of the race.

Third ballot
Nancy Lord defeated Richard Boddie on the third ballot, securing the Libertarian Party nomination for Vice President.

See also
 Libertarian National Convention
 Other parties' presidential nominating conventions of 1992:
 Democratic
 Republican
 Libertarian Party of Colorado
 U.S. presidential election, 1992

References

Libertarian Party (United States) National Conventions
1992 United States presidential election
Libertarian National Convention
1990s in Chicago
Political conventions in Chicago
Libertarian National Convention